Sravanthi is a 1985 Telugu romance film directed by Kranthi Kumar. The film was remade in Tamil in 1986 as Revathi starring Revathi and Suresh.

Plot
The film depicts the journey of a girl who gradually becomes a strong woman. She knowingly marries a man who is affected with Cancer and he passes away very soon. She somehow manages to get rid of the trauma and marries another man, who has lost his wife and has a little daughter. But unfortunately her second husband becomes intolerant of the love & affection she shows towards him. She thus ends up by taking care of his daughter & the parents of her first husband.

Cast
Mohan
Suhasini Maniratnam as Sravanti
Sarath Babu
Subhalekha Sudhakar
Mucherla Aruna
Nirmalamma

Awards
National Film Awards
National Film Award for Best Feature Film in Telugu - 1986

References 

1980s Telugu-language films
1985 films
Films scored by K. Chakravarthy
Telugu films remade in other languages
Indian films about cancer
Best Telugu Feature Film National Film Award winners
Films directed by Kranthi Kumar